Regina Kent (September 4, 1967 – August 16, 1999) was a Hong Kong actress who acted in some notable Hong Kong films in the 1980s.

Career

Acting
Kent starred as May in the 1986 film Legacy of Rage alongside Brandon Lee and Michael Wong. She then played Peggy Lung in the 1987 film A Better Tomorrow 2 alongside Chow Yun-fat and Dean Shek. She appeared in two Jackie Chan films, the 1987 film Project A Part II and 1989 film Miracles. She played a Nun in the 1989 film Vampire Vs. Vampire along with Lam Ching-ying. Kent retired from acting at age 23, in 1990.

Death
On August 16, 1999, Kent died of a brain tumor at the age of 31.

Filmography

Movies
Black Thunderstorm (1984)
Journey of the Doomed (1985)
Jazz of the Poker (1985)
Grow Up in Anger (1986)
Love Me Vampire (1986)
Legacy of Rage (1986)
Project A Part II (1987)
A Better Tomorrow 2 (1987)
Ghost in the House (1988)
The Inspector Wears Skirts (1988)
Proud and Confidence (1989)
The Inspector Wears Skirts II (1989)
Chinese Cop-Out (1989)
Club Girls (1989)
Miracles (1989)
Vampire Vs. Vampire (1989)
Gangland Odyssey (1990)

External links

1967 births
1999 deaths
Hong Kong film actresses
20th-century Hong Kong actresses
Malaysian born Hong Kong artists